Padam is a sub-tribe of the Adi tribe of Abotani clan which speaks one of the Sino-Tibetan languages. Padam makes up 30–35% of the Adis and are the strongest sub-tribe of the Adis. They were a nomadic warrior race and used to had a reputation as fierce warrior by pre colonial period, they are believed to have migrated to present Arunachal Pradesh from Tibet. They were also known by the name Bor Abors in the past by their Assam counterparts and the British government. They inhabits in the region of upper siang, east siang, lower Dibang valley and parts of Lohit and Namsai district of Arunachal Pradesh

Location 
Although it is almost  from Pasighat, their land resides in the Upper Siang district, throughout the Lower Dibang Valley, and makes up about 50 percent of the Lohit district. Their indigenous land is watered by the Yamne River flowing through the valley.

Culture 
They were originally nomadic people but usually grow their food, mainly rice. The Padam people eat birds and animals, such as pigs, cows, and mithun.

Padam men wear different varieties of clothes and costumes. Traditional clothing for men includes red, blue,brown or black coats with various designs & patterns mostly Tibetan manufactured and a cotton cloth on the bottom, varieties of bamboo helmets decorated with boar teeth, bear hairs or red-dyed yak tails, and naturally colored stones worn as a necklace called . Padam women wear a gale on top of their heads, a black cotton cloth with gale on the bottom, and necklaces called  as part of their traditional dress.

Padam people have their major festival as Solung Lune, Solung Etor or Solung Lutor and Unying Aaran.

See also 
 Adi-Padam language

References 

Tribes of Arunachal Pradesh